Steel is a 2012 Italian drama film directed by Stefano Mordini.

It is based on the 2010 novel Steel (Acciaio) by Silvia Avallone. The film is set in the industrial town of Piombino, Tuscany and focuses on a working class family involved in the Piombino steel plants' crisis. It premiered at the 69th Venice International Film Festival on 3 September 2012.

Cast
Michele Riondino as Alessio
Vittoria Puccini as Elena
Matilde Giannini as Anna
Anna Bellezza as Francesca
Francesco Turbanti as Mattia
Luca Guastini as Cristiano
Monica Brachini as Sandra
Massimo Popolizio as Arturo

References

External links

2012 films
2010s Italian-language films
2012 drama films
Italian drama films
Films directed by Stefano Mordini
Films set in Tuscany
Films shot in Tuscany
2010s Italian films